Gaprindashvili is a Georgian-language surname. It may refer to:

Valerian Gaprindashvili (1888–1941), Georgian poet
Nona Gaprindashvili (b. 1941), Georgian chess player, Grandmaster
Valeriane Gaprindashvili (b. 1982), Georgian chess player, Grandmaster

Georgian-language surnames
Surnames of Georgian origin